Coup de Grace is the fourteenth studio album by the Stranglers, released in 1998 by Eagle Records. It was the last album to feature guitarist John Ellis, who left the band in 2000.

The tracks on Coup de Grace represent a greater writing input from bassist Jean-Jacques Burnel than on more recent outings; he also sings four of the ten tracks. Heavily influenced by the band's troop-entertaining trips to such places as the Falkland Islands and Bosnia, and (in Burnel's words) "life in general", the tracks covered such topics as the ravages of war, religious conflicts, and failed relationships. The album included the minimally-accompanied ballad "In the End".

"Miss You" shares its title with a track on the previous Stranglers album Written in Red, but is a different song.

The album failed to reach the official UK Albums Chart, their first such release not to do so.

Track listing

Cat no/Label: EAGCD042/Eagle

Personnel
 The Stranglers
 Paul Roberts – vocals, production
 Jean-Jacques Burnel – bass, vocals (lead vocals on 2, 5, 7, 9), production
 John Ellis – guitar, production
 Dave Greenfield – keyboards, programming, vocals (lead vocals on 1), production
 Jet Black – drums, production

 Additional musicians 
 Lisa George  – backing vocals (2)
 Lizzie Deane – backing vocals (2)

 Technical
 David M. Allen – production, engineering, Pro Tools
 Chris Jarrett  – engineering, programming
 Matt Hay – engineering
 Clare, Ben, Neil – engineering assistance
 Trevor Dawkins – technician
 Bruce Gooding – technician
 Stuart Green – packaging

References

1998 albums
The Stranglers albums
albums produced by David M. Allen